Charltona synaula is a moth in the family Crambidae. It was described by Edward Meyrick in 1933. It is found in the Democratic Republic of the Congo.

References

Crambinae
Moths described in 1933
Taxa named by Edward Meyrick